The Haynes Aero Skyblazer was a project that proposed a "roadable aircraft", more commonly known as a flying car.
Robin Haynes began working on the project in 1989 and believed it would cost between four and five million dollars to create his prototype and the project was always considered a longshot.

The Skyblazer concept falls into the category of an "Integrated" vehicle, which is one of the two viable flying car concepts.  An "Integrated" vehicle retains all the components needed for both modes of travel at all times.  The other type of flying car is a "Modular" vehicle, where some part of the vehicle is left behind during a transition between modes - usually the wings are left at the airfield while the car part is driven on the road to complete the journey.

References

Abandoned civil aircraft projects
Roadable aircraft